Dennis McGrane (born July 7, 1962) is an American former ski jumper who competed in the 1984 Winter Olympics and in the 1988 Winter Olympics.

References

1962 births
Living people
American male ski jumpers
Olympic ski jumpers of the United States
Ski jumpers at the 1984 Winter Olympics
Ski jumpers at the 1988 Winter Olympics